Graham Alexander Webster OBE (31 May 1913 – 21 May 2001) was a British archaeologist, one of the pre-eminent figures of Roman-British archaeology in the late 20th century.

Life 
Webster was born at Stamford, Lincolnshire. He developed an interest in Roman Britain while still at school, but opted for a career as a civil engineer. During World War II he served with the Air Ministry, building airfields, and during this period became engaged in archaeological excavations, most notably in the cities of Canterbury and Lincoln. In Lincoln in 1945 he joined the City Engineer's Department and directed excavations on the Westgate School site which were to reveal the earliest evidence for the Roman Legionary defences of Lincoln. He was also to excavate the Roman pottery kilns at Swanpool and South Carlton.  His growing reputation in the field led to his full-time appointment in 1948 as Curator of the Grosvenor Museum in Chester. While employed there he wrote The Roman Army (1956), which would evolve eventually into his most famous book, The Roman Imperial Army, published in 1969 and in numerous later editions.

Webster also studied for an MA at Manchester University and helped organise an archaeological training school at Great Casterton in Rutland. In 1954 he was appointed archaeology tutor in the Extra-Mural Department of Birmingham University. He obtained his PhD from the same institution, with a thesis on Roman strategy in Britain under the governor Ostorius Scapula. He conducted a number of excavations, notably at Whaddon Hill, Dorset and at Barnsley Park, Gloucestershire (1961–79), the latter developing into an archaeological training school and where he met his second wife, Diana (married 1968). Webster's most celebrated excavation, however, was at the abandoned Roman city of Wroxeter near Shrewsbury (1955–85), where he also initiated a training school.

In his later years, Webster was a prolific and highly successful writer, with a succession of books on various aspects of Roman Britain. He served as archaeological advisor to Batsford Books, where he oversaw the publication of a formidable list of archaeological works. He received the Order of the British Empire in 1982.

Webster is considered one of the pioneering giants of Romano-British excavation. Throughout his long career he gained a reputation as an inspiring archaeological mentor, always willing, despite his enormous commitments, to give advice and practical assistance to both the expert and neophyte. At the time of his death in 2001 he was held in enormous affection by a whole generation of now established archaeologists, remembered as someone generous with both his time and his friendship.

References

British archaeologists
Officers of the Order of the British Empire
1913 births
2001 deaths
20th-century archaeologists
People from Stamford, Lincolnshire